King'ori is an administrative ward in the Meru District of the Arusha Region of Tanzania. According to the 2002 census, the ward has a total population of 20,670.

References

Wards of Meru District
Wards of Arusha Region